Bursaray (sometimes stylized as BursaRay) is a rapid transit system in the city of Bursa, Marmara Region, Turkey, built in 2000 by TÜVASAŞ, and operated by Burulaş. The name Bursaray is a portmanteau of Bursa, and Ray, the Turkish word for "rail". The Bursaray metro opened for passenger service on 24 April 2002. The metro system presently consists of two lines, which share a main line in the east, and branch into two lines at the western end of the system.

It is planned to expand the Bursaray system to a  network in the future.

History
 31 Jan 1997: Bursaray contract signed
 14 Oct 1998: construction begins
 24 Apr 2002: passenger trial service begins
 19 Aug 2002: official opening of first line: Şehreküstü - Küçük Sanayi (Hipodrom)
 02 Jan 2005: construction work begins on BursaRay Phase 1 Stage B
 06 Apr 2008: extension east from Sehreküstü - Arabayatagi (i.e. BursaRay Phase 1 Stage B enters service)
 28 Oct 2008: Phase 2 construction work begins
 24 Dec 2010: extension: Phase 2, Küçük Sanayi (Hipodrom) - Özlüce (2.9 km), enters service
 19 Sep 2011: extension: Phase 2, Özlüce - Üniversite (3.6 km)
 15 Dec 2011: extension: Phase 2, Organize Sanayi (1050 Konutlar) - Emek (2.5 km)
 19 Mar 2014: extension: Phase 3, Arabayatağı - Otosansit (4.4 km)
 27 Mar 2014: extension: Phase 3, Otosansit - Gürsu (2.0 km)
 05 Jun 2014: extension: completion of Phase 3, Gürsu - Kestel (1.5 km)
 02 Apr 2021: Phase Hospital construction work begins
 04 Nov 2021: Infill station "Odunluk" between Nilüfer and Acemler was opened.

Operations

Rolling stock
A total of 48 cars of the B80 type ( long) were delivered by Siemens Uerdingen (in collaboration with the local company TÜVASAŞ). Siemens TS supplied the signalling automation systems and the power supply system.

Later the fleet was enlarged with 30 Bombardier Flexity Swift light rail cars (similar to those on the U5 line on the Frankfurt U-Bahn) from Bombardier. After that, Burulas purchased 44 used 'Sneltram' Duewag SG2 (Duewag T-cars) from Rotterdam; 25 of which were placed in service while the other 19 were used to provide spare parts as needed.
All Duewag SG2 cars are discontinued today. 

In addition, 60 Durmazlar GreenCity cars are in service.

Network Map

See also

 Trams in Bursa
 List of metro systems

References

External links
 Bursaray – official site 
 Image of Bursaray
 Map

Rapid transit in Turkey
Railway lines opened in 2002
Standard gauge railways in Turkey
Transport in Bursa
1500 V DC railway electrification